Furkan Palalı (born 27 October 1986) is a Turkish actor and model who was chosen as the Best Model of Turkey in 2011. Since 2010, he has work in both the national and international fashion industry and has pursued a career in acting, starting by joining Tuncay Özinel Theatre in 2010.

Early life and education 
He completed his middle school education at Konya Private Diltaş High School. After graduating from Konya Dolapoğlu Anatolian High School, Palalı completed his university education in the Department of Geological Engineering of Ankara Hacettepe University. Palalı, who received 6 months of creative drama training in Ankara and theater acting training from Tuncay Özinel and Ferdi Merter, continued his studies towards a master's degree in Marmara University Radio and Television Department.

Career

Basketball career 
Palalı played for the Konyaspor basketball team, then part of the Turkey's main basketball league, for seven years. In 2000, he joined the Konya branch of Tofaş sports club. After playing in the team for two years, he gave up his basketball career to focus on his studies.

Modeling 
During his university studies, Palalı started his modeling career at an Ankara-based agency, where he enrolled during his school term through the support of his friends and a relative working in a modelling agency in Ankara. After graduating from the university, he signed a contract with Selin Boronkay Agency in 2010. Having participated in various events for 1.5 years through this agency and after posing in many fashion shows and catalogs, Palalı participated in the 2011 Best Model of Turkey contest and finished first.

Acting 
He made his television debut in 2010 with his role as Aras in Küçük Sırlar adaptation of "Gossip Girl". He then appeared as a guest on Adını Feriha Koydum.

Meanwhile, he started a career on stage and was cast in plays such as Uyan Uyan Gazi Kemal and Tetikçi. He appeared at last six times in a leading role at Tepebaşı Theatre as a part of the play Tetikçi, written and directed by Ferdi Merter. 

He then had a brief role in ATV's Hayat Devam Ediyor series in February 2012. Palalı starred in the period series Son Yaz between 2012 and 2013, alongside Hazal Kaya, Tuğçe Kazaz and Tardu Flordun.

He was then cast alongside Ekin Türkmen and Müge Boz in Show TV series Aşk Emek İster in 2013.

Palalı portrayed the National Intelligence Organization officer Murad Altay in Osman Sınav's Kızılelma series, which was broadcast on TRT 1. The series premiered in January 2014 and concluded with 28 episodes in October 2014.

He then had a leading role in TRT 1 crime series Son Çıkış. In 2016, he made his cinematic debut with a leading role in the movie Somuncu Baba Aşkın Sırrı. In June 2016, he began to appear in a main role on the TV series No 309, which was broadcast on FOX.

Filmography

Awards 
2020: Buzz Magazine Actors Awards. The Golden Men. The Best Actor in Turkish Drama.

2019: 46Th Golden Butterfly Awards. Best Actor in a Romantic Comedy Series by  My sweet lie / Benim Tatli Yalamin. (Nominee).

2019: Turkey & Azerbaijan Fellowship Awards. Best Actor Romantic Comedy.

2019: Turkey Brand Awards. Leading Brand Award Best Romantic Comedy Actor of the year. My sweet lie / Benim Tatli Yalamin.

References

External links 
 
 

1986 births
Turkish male television actors
Turkish male film actors
Turkish male models
Living people